is a working class district in Kita, Tokyo, Japan. It is about 10 minutes north of Ikebukuro by train. It is serviced by the Saikyo Line via Jūjō Station and the Keihin-Tōhoku Line via Higashi-Jūjō Station. It is particularly well known for the long serpentine shopping arcade known as Jūjō Ginza, very close to the main entrance/exit of Jūjō Station.

At first glance Jūjō seems a run-down place but a real sense of community thrives here, evidenced by the large number of traditional shops, small scale public baths (sentō) and enthusiastic festivals.

Districts of Kita, Tokyo